"Pick a Part That's New" is a song by Welsh rock band Stereophonics. It was released on 3 May 1999 as the third single from their second studio album, Performance and Cocktails (1999). The single reached number four on the UK Singles Chart and number 17 in Ireland. In March 2000, the song charted in Canada, peaking at number 22 on the RPM Top 30 Rock Report. The song was certified silver in the United Kingdom in 2017 for sales and streams exceeding 200,000 units.

An acoustic version is found on CD2 of the "Pick a Part That's New" single. A live version from Morfa Stadium is available on CD2 of the "I Wouldn't Believe Your Radio" single.

Music video
The music video features the band parodying the 1969 film The Italian Job in Turin and performing in a bus which is on a cliff edge.

Track listings
All songs were written by Kelly Jones, Richard Jones, and Stuart Cable except where noted.

UK CD1
 "Pick a Part That's New"
 "Nice to Be Out" (demo)
 "Positively 4th Street" 
 "Pick a Part That's New" (video)

UK CD2
 "Pick a Part That's New" (acoustic)
 "In My Day"
 "Something in the Way" 

UK 7-inch and cassette single
 "Pick a Part That's New"
 "Nice to Be Out" (demo)

European CD single
 "Pick a Part That's New"
 "Sunny Afternoon" 

Australian CD single
 "Pick a Part That's New"
 "Nice to Be Out" (demo)
 "Positively 4th Street" 
 "Pick a Part That's New" (acoustic version)

Credits and personnel
Credits are taken from the Performance and Cocktails album booklet.

Recording
 Written in September 1997 (a hotel in New York)
 Recorded at Parkgate (East Sussex, England)
 Mastered at Metropolis (London, England)

Personnel

 Kelly Jones – music, lyrics, vocals, guitar
 Richard Jones – music, bass
 Stuart Cable – music, drums
 Marshall Bird – keyboards
 Bird & Bush – production
 Al Clay – mixing
 Ian Cooper – mastering

Charts

Certifications

Release history

References

1997 songs
1999 singles
Songs written by Kelly Jones
Stereophonics songs
V2 Records singles